Soyaló is a town and one of the 119 Municipalities of Chiapas, in southern Mexico.

As of 2010, the municipality had a total population of 9,740, up from 7,767 as of 2005. It covers an area of 178.9 km².

As of 2010, the town of Soyaló had a population of 4,014. Other than the town of Soyaló, the municipality had 20 localities, the largest of which (with 2010 populations in parentheses) was: Francisco Sarabia (3,318), classified as rural.

References

Municipalities of Chiapas